Tarantism is the debut album by Los Angeles rock band Tito & Tarantula, released in 1997.

The album was the first full-length CD that the band ever released, after developing a fan base from performing the songs "After Dark", "Angry Cockroaches (Cucarachas Enojadas)", and "Opening Boxes" on the From Dusk Till Dawn soundtrack as well as the songs "Back to the House (That Love Built)", "Strange Face (of Love)", and "White Train" to the Desperado soundtrack, both of those films by Robert Rodriguez, who co-produced the album. Several members of the band were also featured in From Dusk Till Dawn, playing as the band in the "Titty Twister" bar, performing "After Dark" and "Angry Cockroaches (Cucarachas Enojadas)", and are well-remembered for the scene. Music videos were made for "After Dark" and "Back to the House (That Love Built)", using clips from the films mixed with footage of the band performing them.

"After Dark" and "Back to the House (That Love Built)" were co-written by rhythm guitarist/lead vocalist Tito Larriva's former bandmates in the Cruzados. "Back to the House (That Love Built)" was written by Larriva with former bassist Tony Marsico, along with Charlie Midnight and Marsico's wife, Valerie Marsico. "After Dark" was written by Larriva and former lead guitarist Steven Hufsteter while they were still in the Cruzados. Hufsteter later joined Tito & Tarantula as a second lead guitarist in 2002, and is currently still in the band. The album also features guest appearances by Marsico and former Cruzados drummer Chalo Quintana.

Track listing
"After Dark" (Steven Hufsteter, Tito Larriva) − 3:44
"Smiling Karen" (Peter Atanasoff, Larriva) − 3:58
"Slippin' and Slidin'" (Larriva, Danny Kortchmar, Waddy Wachtel) − 3:43
"Strange Face (of Love)" (Larriva) − 5:38
"Angry Cockroaches (Cucarachas Enojadas)" (Atanasoff, Larriva) − 4:39
"Back to the House (That Love Built)" (Larriva, Tony Marsico, Valerie Marsico, Charlie Midnight) − 4:32
"Jupiter" (Atanasoff, Larriva) − 6:08
"Sweet Cycle (of Life)" (Atanasoff, Larriva) − 4:58
"Flying in My Sleep" (Atanasoff, Larriva) − 3:58
"Killing Just for Fun" (Atanasoff, Larriva) − 4:38

Personnel
Peter Atanasoff – lead guitar, backing vocals
Tito Larriva – rhythm guitar, lead vocals
Jennifer Condos – bass, backing vocals
Lyn Bertles – violin, mandolin, recorder, harmonica, backing vocals
Nick Vincent – drums, percussion, backing vocals

Additional personnel
Mark Goldenberg on "After Dark" and "Angry Cockroaches (Cucarachas Enojadas)"
Debra Dobkin on "Jupiter" and "Killing Just for Fun"
Charlie Midnight on "Slippin' and Slidin'"
Carlos Quiaco on "Slippin' and Slidin'"
Mike Thompson on "Strange Face (of Love)"
Chalo Quintana on "Strange Face (of Love)" and "Back to the House (That Love Built)"
Tony Marsico on "Strange Face (of Love)" and "Back to the House (That Love Built)"
Robert Rodriguez on "Angry Cockroaches (Cucarachas Enojadas)"
Waddy Wachtel on "Slippin' and Slidin'"
Adrian Esparza on "Back to the House (That Love Built)"

Production
Brad Gilderman – mixing on "Smiling Karen", "Jupiter", "Sweet Cycle (of Life)", "Flying in My Sleep" and "Killing Just for Fun", engineer on "Smiling Karen", "Slippin' and Slidin'", "Jupiter", "Flying in My Sleep" and "Killing Just for Fun"
Dave Shiffman – mixing on "Slippin' and Slidin'"
Thom Panunzio – mixing on "Back to the House (That Love Built)"
Joel Soyfer – mixing on "After Dark", engineer on "Slippin' and Slidin'" and "Back to the House (That Love Built)"
David Tickle – mixing on "Strange Face (of Love)", engineer on "Strange Face (of Love)"
Julian Mack – mixing on "Angry Cockroaches (Cucarachas Enojadas)", engineer on "Angry Cockroaches (Cucarachas Enojadas)"
Mark Goldenberg – engineer on "After Dark" and "Angry Cockroaches (Cucarachas Enojadas)"
Lisa Lewis – assistant engineer
Jay Baumgardner – assistant engineer
Paul B. – assistant engineer
Jamie Seyberth – assistant engineer
Ryan Arnold – assistant engineer
Laurent – assistant engineer

Sales

References

1997 debut albums
Tito & Tarantula albums
Albums produced by David Tickle